The  Directorate of Naval Operations and Trade was a staff directorate created in 1967 it replaced the Trade and Operations Division. The directorate under the Ministry of Defence (Naval Staff) as part of the Ministry of Defence (Navy Department). It was administered by the Director of Naval Operations and Trade. It existed until 2003.

History
The directorate was established in November 1967 when it replaced the former Trade and Operations Division. Its initial responsibilities included the planning of operations; deployments and programming of ships and protection of merchant vessels. The directorate was administered by the Director of Naval Operations and Trade. The directorate was under the superintendence of the Assistant Chief of the Naval Staff (Operations/Air) (1967), Assistant Chief of the Naval Staff (Operations and Air), (1968-1984). It existed until March 2003 when it was abolished.

Administration
Included:

Director of Naval Operations and Trade
 Captain Terence L. Martin: November 1967-May 1970
 Captain David A. Loram: May 1970-March 1971
 Captain Dennis W. Foster: March 1971 – 1972
 Captain David W. Brown: ?-November 1972
 Captain Gwynedd I. Pritchard: November 1972-July 1974
 Captain John M.H. Cox: July 1974-April 1976
 Captain Michael C. Henry: April 1976-March 1978
 Captain George M.F. Vallings: March 1978-May 1980
 Captain Brian R. Outhwaite: May 1980-February 1982
 Captain John Garnier: February 1982-January 1985
 Captain A. Peter Woodhead: January 1985-June 1986
 Captain Geoffrey R.W. Biggs: June 1986-October 1989
 Captain John S. Lang: October 1989 – 1991
 Captain Peter J. Cowling: 1992-1994
 Commodore Christopher W. Roddis: 1994-1996
 Captain Martin D. Macpherson: 1996-1998
 Commodore David G. Snelson: 1998-1999
 Commodore Philip L. Wilcocks: 1999-July 2001
 Commodore Andrew P. Dickson: 2001-February 2003
 Commodore Peter J.F. Eberle: February–March 2003

Citations

Sources
 Grove, Eric (1987). Vanguard to Trident : British naval policy since World War II. London, England: Bodley Head. .
 Mackie, Colin (January 2019). "Royal Navy Senior Appointments from 1865" (PDF). gulabin.com. C. Mackie.
 Ministers and Departments: England". The Civil Service Yearbook (1 ed.). London, England: HM Stationery Office. 1974..

Naval Staff Directorates of the Ministry of Defence (United Kingdom)
Military units and formations established in 1967